Unlistenable is the fifth studio album by Steel Pole Bath Tub, released on September 24, 2002, by 0 to 1 Recordings.

Track listing

Personnel 
Adapted from the Unlistenable liner notes.

Steel Pole Bath Tub
Dale Flattum – bass guitar, vocals
Mike Morasky – guitar, vocals
Darren Morey (as D.K. Mor-X) – drums, vocals

Production and additional personnel
Steel Pole Bath Tub – production

Release history

References

External links 
 

2002 albums
Steel Pole Bath Tub albums